Thiago Furtuoso dos Santos (born 8 June 1987) is a retired Brazilian professional footballer who plays as a forward.

Career

Othellos Athienou
On 26 July 2019, Furtuoso moved to Cyprus and signed with Cypriot Second Division club Othellos Athienou FC.

References

External links
Thiago Furtuoso player statistics 2019-20 at CFA

Living people
Brazilian footballers
Brazilian expatriate footballers
1987 births
Guaratinguetá Futebol players
Futebol Clube Santa Cruz players
Itumbiara Esporte Clube players
Centro Sportivo Alagoano players
Arema F.C. players
Madura United F.C. players
Bhayangkara F.C. players
Associação Esportiva Velo Clube Rioclarense players
Al-Nahda Club (Oman) players
Jeddah Club players
Othellos Athienou F.C. players
Kalamata F.C. players
Oman Professional League players
Saudi First Division League players
Liga 1 (Indonesia) players
Football League (Greece) players
Association football forwards
Expatriate footballers in Indonesia
Expatriate footballers in Oman
Expatriate footballers in Saudi Arabia
Expatriate footballers in Cyprus
Expatriate footballers in Greece
Brazilian expatriate sportspeople in Indonesia
Brazilian expatriate sportspeople in Oman
Brazilian expatriate sportspeople in Saudi Arabia
Brazilian expatriate sportspeople in Cyprus
Brazilian expatriate sportspeople in Greece